Applied Physiology is the study of biological systems and steps into practice. It involves the application of the knowledge of physiological properties to restore core stability and joint stability. It differs from clinical practice.

See also
 Physiology

References

External links
 Journal of Applied Physiology
 Applied Physiology
 Applied Physiology Ltd
 European Journal of Applied Physiology

Physiology